Guanine nucleotide-binding protein G(z) subunit alpha is a protein that in humans is encoded by the GNAZ gene.

Function 

The protein encoded by this gene is a member of a G protein subfamily that mediates signal transduction in pertussis toxin-insensitive systems.  This encoded protein may play a role in maintaining the ionic balance of perilymphatic and endolymphatic cochlear fluids.

Interactions 

GNAZ has been shown to interact with EYA2, RGS20 and RGS19.

References

Further reading